Jean Sullivan (May 26, 1923 – February 27, 2003) was an American actress and dancer. She acted in film, television and stage productions, and danced both flamenco and ballet, the latter with the American Ballet Theatre.

Biography
Sullivan was born on May 26, 1923, in Logan, Utah, the daughter of Army Colonel Alexander Sullivan and Claire Cardon Sullivan. She had two younger sisters and a younger brother. As she grew up, she lived in Fort Sam Houston, Texas; Columbus, Ohio; and upstate New York before she reached Hollywood. She went to UCLA to study English literature major but changed her major to drama.

She was discovered by a scout from Warner Brothers, who saw her acting in the play Our Town at UCLA, and was signed immediately. (In 1943, Sullivan said that the scout urged her to sign but, "I told him I'd never thought of motion pictures and definitely wasn't ready for that sort of thing anyway. But he kept coming back. After six months I finally said yes.") Before she signed, she had planned to seek a career in modern ballet.

Sullivan moved to New York and turned her focus to ballet, both studying it and performing as a professional dancer, eventually joining the American Ballet Theatre.

She was co-artistic director with Michael Fischetti of the South Street Theatre Company, and played Spanish guitar, cello, and piano.

Sullivan died of cardiac arrest in Woodland Hills, California at the age of 79.  She had a daughter, the actress Francesca Poston, by actor Tom Poston, whom she married in 1955. She and Poston separated in 1959 and divorced two years later.

Filmography

Features
 Uncertain Glory (1944)
 Escape in the Desert (1945)
 Roughly Speaking (1945)
 Squirm (1976)

Television
 One Day at a Time
 Somerset
 The Doctors
 Search for Tomorrow
 NBC Family Hour
 Colgate Family Hour
 Lamp Unto Thy Feet

Theatre roles
 The Seagull – Arkadina – Sybil Burton's New Theatre
 Macbeth – Lady Macbeth – Royal Shakespeare Company at JASTA
 Much Ado About Nothing – Hero  – Royal Shakespeare Company for the Theatre Guild
 Phedre – Phedre – La Comedie Francaise (replaced Beatrice Straight) – Off-Broadway and touring
 Luv – Ruth
 The Bald Soprano – Mrs. Smith
 The Dark Lady of the Sonnets – Queen Elizabeth I
 Spoon River Anthology
 The Stronger – South Street Theatre (NYC)
 Before Breakfast –  Vienna English Theatre (Vienna, Austria)

Awards
Sullivan was selected as an Honored Member in the "US Executives" Category for 1989's "Who's Who in America".

References

External links
 Jean Sullivan Online
 
 

1923 births
2003 deaths
American film actresses
American stage actresses
American television actresses
American ballerinas
Flamenco dancers
People from Logan, Utah
People from Greater Los Angeles
20th-century American actresses
21st-century American women
20th-century American ballet dancers